Charles James Frank Dowsett (2 January 1924 – 8 January 1998) was the first Calouste Gulbenkian Professor of Armenian at the University of Oxford from 1965 to 1991. A teacher and raconteur, he had a large range of interests and culminated in his work on the poet Sayat Nova based on research on the Corpus Scriptorum Christianorum Orientalium in 1996.

Under the pseudonym Charles Downing he also published several works for children.

Armenian scholar
Born in London, Dowsett came into contact with expert scholar Harold Bailey whilst at Peterhouse, Cambridge, who introduced him to Armenian. After further study (including four years on a substantial British scholarship in Paris), Dowsett was appointed as Lecturer in Armenian at the School of Oriental and African Studies in London - the only post in the subject in Britain at the time. In 1965 when the  Chair was established at Oxford University, he was the obvious candidate.

Bibliography
 History of the Caucasian Albanians (1961) (translator)
 Penitential of David of Gandzak (1961) (translator)
 The Inscribed Tiles (1972)
 Kütahya Tiles and Pottery from the Armenian Cathedral of St.James, Jerusalem. 2 Volumes. With John Carswell, Oxford: Clarendon Press (1972) 
 Sayat'-Nova: An 18th-century Troubadour: a Biographical and Literary Study (1996)

Children's author
Dowsett wrote under the pseudonym "Charles Downing" and published several works for children.

Bibliography
 Tales of the Hodja (1964) - illustrated by the Greek cartoonist Papas.
 Russian Tales and Legends (1956)
 Armenian Folktales and Fables (1972)

Notes

References
 Pembroke College, Oxford University, Fellows joining in the 1960s. Accessed 13 February 2007.

External links
 Record of the donation of Dowsett's library

1924 births
1998 deaths
Armenian studies scholars
Statutory Professors of the University of Oxford
Alumni of Peterhouse, Cambridge
Fellows of Pembroke College, Oxford
Academics of SOAS University of London
Fellows of the British Academy
British writers